(February 26, 1902 – February 5, 1973) was a Japanese Home Ministry government official and politician. He was born in Niigata Prefecture. He was a graduate of the University of Tokyo. He was governor of Shiga Prefecture (1945–1946). He was Grand Chamberlain of Japan (1965–1969).

References

Bibliography
歴代知事編纂会編『新編日本の歴代知事』歴代知事編纂会、1991年。
秦郁彦編『日本官僚制総合事典：1868 - 2000』東京大学出版会、2001年。
秦郁彦編『日本近現代人物履歴事典』東京大学出版会、2002年。

1902 births
1973 deaths
Japanese Home Ministry government officials
Governors of Shiga Prefecture
University of Tokyo alumni
Politicians from Niigata Prefecture